Nurcan is a Turkish feminine given name. It may refer to:

Nurcan Baysal (born 1975), Turkish journalist
Nurcan Çelik (born 1980), Turkish women's footballer and football club owner
Nurcan Taylan (born 1983), Turkish Olympic, world and European champion in weightlifting
Nurcan Tunçbağ, Turkish academic

Turkish feminine given names